Johanna Schneller is an American-born Canadian film journalist and television personality, currently the host of the film talk show The Filmmakers on CBC Television.

A freelance celebrity interviewer for such publications as Vanity Fair, GQ, Chatelaine and Toronto Life, she is also the film columnist for The Globe and Mail, and hosted TVOntario's weekly Saturday Night at the Movies for two seasons. She has also been a regular television columnist for the Toronto Star and the StarMetro chain. Schneller has lived in Toronto since 1994 with her husband, Canadian journalist Ian Brown, and their two children, Hayley and Walker.

References

External links
 Johanna Schneller, The Globe and Mail

Canadian columnists
Canadian television hosts
American expatriates in Canada
American people of German descent
Living people
Year of birth missing (living people)
Canadian women journalists
Canadian women television personalities
Canadian women columnists
Canadian Film Centre alumni
Canadian women non-fiction writers
Canadian women television hosts